Annie Jarraud-Vergnolle (born 7 February 1948) is a member of the Senate of France, representing the Pyrénées-Atlantiques department.  She is a member of the Socialist Party.

References
Page on the Senate website

1948 births
Living people
French Senators of the Fifth Republic
Socialist Party (France) politicians
Women members of the Senate (France)
Senators of Pyrénées-Atlantiques